Mordellistena nessebaricus is a species of beetle in the genus Mordellistena of the family Mordellidae. It was described by Batten in 1980.

References

Beetles described in 1980
nessebaricus